Autazes is a municipality located in the Brazilian state of Amazonas. Its population was 40,290 (2020) and its area is 7,599 km². It is located south-east of Manaus, just west of the Madeira River.

References

Municipalities in Amazonas (Brazilian state)